Chetvert is a rural locality (a village) in Andreyevskoye Rural Settlement, Alexandrovsky District, Vladimir Oblast, Russia. The population was 58 as of 2010.

Geography 
Pokrov is the nearest rural locality.

References 

Rural localities in Alexandrovsky District, Vladimir Oblast